Linda Yamane (born 1949) is an Rumsien Ohlone artist and historian, and has reconstructed and "almost singlehandedly revived" the Rumsien language, Rumsien basket-making methods, and other Rumsien traditions.

Family life 
Yamane was born in 1949 in San José, CA. The daughter of a Spanish-Basque father and a Rumsien-Spanish mother, Yamane's grandmother—Beatrice Barcelona Reno—lived with her family when she was young. By the time Yamane's grandmother had reached adulthood, scholars and the federal government had already declared the various peoples comprising the Ohlone extinct. Thus, her grandmother was able to tell her stories reaching back to the late 1800s, and could teach her a bit about medicinal plant uses, but could not really teach her precisely about Rumsien culture.

As a result, Yamane was able to trace her family back to the 1770s, including to Josef Manuel Higuera, one of the original settlers who as part of the planned creation of San Jose, California's first Spanish civilian city, in 1777. Growing up, Yamane could also identify Margarita Maria a woman from Tucutnut, the largest village of the Rumsen local tribe of the Carmel Valley in the 1770s. She was given that name when baptized by priests at the mission in 1773. However, she had heard neither the term "Rumsien" nor "Ohlone" until she was in her 30s.

Yamane married local historian and former curator of the Monterey History & Maritime Museum, Tim Thomas. She has a son.

Career 
Yamane is a singer, painter, basket makers, writer, canoe builder, expert on Rumsien games, and on the Rumsien language. She has worked as a graphic designer and an illustrator. Through her passion for researching her roots, she has developed substantial knowledge about Rumsien history and traditions. She partners and consults with many museums and other cultural institutions to help preserve and share knowledge of the Rumsien people, and more generally of various Ohlone peoples. For example, in 2005 she worked with National Park Service ranger Naomi Torres and historian Paul Scolari to curate the exhibit Ohlone Portraits: Our Faces, Our Families, Our Stories at San Francisco's Crissy Field Center of the Golden Gate National Recreation Area and the Golden Gate National Parks Conservancy. Nineteen almost life-sized portraits from the late 19th Century and early 20th Century appeared with biographies and with smaller photos of those individuals' descendants. She creates art, such as the drawing of the tule dwelling that appears on interpretive signs in the Hillside Natural Area in El Cerrito, CA. She also created a large painting of a former village, Pruistac, for the Sanchez Adobe Park. For the past two decades she has helped organize Ohlone Day in Henery Cowell Redwoods State Park.

Rumsien Language 
Because the last of the elders who spoke Rumsien died out while living in the missions, knowledge of the language were dead prior to the start of the Twentieth Century. Yamane's grandmother had told her some Rumsien names and other words, and told her many stories that came from the Rumsien tradition, but that was all.

In the mid-1980s, however, Yamane found out about the records of Smithsonian ethnographer John P. Harrington, collected in the 1930s. Harrington had worked with a Rumsien-English woman named Isabel Meadows and another Rumsien elder, Manuel Onesimo, to document the Rumsien language and also information about daily life and traditions of the Rumsien. These notes were archived at the Smithsonian, and available at some universities, on microfilm. However, they were written in an old, highly localized dialect of Spanish and Yamane was not able to decode them. She and Alex Ramirez, Onesimo's grandson, began working together on translating the documents. They made many aspects of Rumsien life never before known to English speakers available by translating all the documentation into English from an old, local dialect of Spanish in which they were written.

In the course of this research, Yamane found a story about a hummingbird, as well as other tales, and decided to write a book on creation stories for children. Thus, she published When the World Ended: How Hummingbird Got Fire; How People Were Made: Rumsien Ohlone Stories in 1995.

Through this translation project she also met scholar Sandy Lydon, with whom she has been collaborating since the 1980s. They check each other's theories and assumptions in their work on the Rumsien people.

Then, in 1992, while participating in a weeklong “Breath of Life” workshop at University of California, Berkeley, Yamane discovered more vocabulary for types of baskets and about other tools the Rumsien used for daily life. The Breath of Life program, founded by linguist Leanne Hinton, pairs linguists with indigenous individuals want to revive their ancestral languages.

Yamane also discovered records at UC-Berkeley's Hearst Museum. This time, they were wax-cylinder recordings that anthropologist Alfred Kroeber made in the early 20th Century. Elders Viviana Soto and Jacinta Gonzales sang traditional songs and told stories in Rumsien. Using a cassette tape of the recordings, Yamane painstakingly transcribed them. She started matching up what was on the cylinders and what her grandmother had told her. First she reconstructed stories, and then a good portion of the language. From those recordings she was able to hear pronunciations and fill out her dictionary even further.

Thus, Yamane became the first speaker of the language since the last speaker had died in 1939.

Music 
Yamane used the songs from Kroeber's recordings for more than just vocabulary. She focused on reconstructing the songs and sharing them with others.

Basketry 

Rumsien tradition was to burn an individual's personal creations upon their death. Combined with the need to trade for supplies after Spanish colonialists began moving the Rumsien people into missions, and destruction of their possessions to force the Rumsien people into those missions, only an estimated forty Rumsien baskets remained worldwide by the 1980s. Essentially, the Rumsien people stopped making traditional Olivella baskets when European colonialists came to the region. The techniques and style were lost, as no Rumsien basketmakers survived. Yamane learned some very basic techniques in basketmaking, not specifically from indigenous methodologies, in the 1970s, but it was another ten years before she studied an indigenous method of basketmaking from women of the Pomo tribe. She visited museums in California, as well as the Smithsonian, the American Museum of Natural History, the Musee du Quai Branly and the British Museum, all of which had Rumsien baskets in their collections. Yamane thought of these baskets as her "teachers." She took notes and photographs, and describes counting "the number of stitches per inch, coils per inch...." She read notes of ethnographers who had taken an interest in her tribe's basketmaking traditions. She follows the methods and inspiration of the baskets she observed, and uses the same or similar materials, but engages in creation of her own designs. By the mid-1990s she began making her own baskets. She estimates that most baskets take her 2,500-3,000 hours to complete.

Another challenge was finding traditional materials. Yamane started growing a garden at home to have the supplies she needed. She also made agreements with the Bureau of Land Management to collect sedge and other materials from public lands in her region. Even once it is harvested, the willow, sedge, and other materials she uses may take months or years to dry and go through proper preparation for weaving.

Yamane has been a member of the California Indian Basketweavers Association since 1991, when it was founded. She was the co-editor of the organization's periodical: Roots and Shoots. In addition to her work with CIBA, through the Alliance for California Traditional Arts she took on Carol Bachman as an apprentice. Bachman learned both basketweaving and the related art of boat making from Yamane.

Boat making 
Using many of the same skills as basket weaving, Yamane builds tule boats. These boats are called kónon in the Rumsien language. She first learned to make them in the 1980s, when she photographed and took notes on the process at a Coyote Hills Regional Park event in Fremont, CA. It was nearly 20 years for nearly 20 more years, but since the early 2000s she has made dozens of them. She created one of her early the boats for the Monterey History & Art Association's Maritime Museum, and they took it out on the Monterey Bay, possibly the first tule boat on the bay in over 150 years. Yamane and Bachman worked together with Cheryl Carter to build the boat.

Olivella baskets 
Named for the decorative, sequin-like beads made from shells of the Olivella snails found at low tide off the coast of central California that defined them, these baskets had not been made in 150 or more years. The process of making each bead is laborious: collecting shells; baking them; cutting, shaping, and smoothing them. Each bead takes approximately 10 minutes to make, and about 3 in 4 stay whole throughout the process. A large basket might use several thousand olivella beads.

To even see such baskets, Yamane had to samples travel to the East Coast of the United States and in Europe; no known examples remained in California.

Jewelry making 
Yamane also makes jewelry, particularly from abalone shells. Since they are hard to get and abalone are increasingly rare in the ocean, Yamane feels lucky that reaching out to friends and divers helped her build a large collection of the shells. In response, Yamane opened an abalone shell "bank" for other indigenous artists who want to make traditional arts.

Select commissioned works 
2009 - Creative Work Fund grant to make one Ohlone presentation basket in collaboration with the Big Sur Land Trust. The basket was displayed on loan at the Trust's Carmel Valley visitor center, which is in the area where Rumsien people once lived. After the basket was completed in 2021, artist Susanne Takehara created a mosaic, Weaving Past & Present, representing the basket on the exterior of an apartment building in East Oakland, in partnership with the EastSide Arts Alliance.

2010 - The Oakland Museum was organizing a new exhibit of baskets from the various indigenous peoples of California, and found they had no baskets from any of the Ohlone tribes that once populated the broader San Francisco Bay Area. Yamane had been a member of the museum's Native Advisory Counsel, as well as actually a consultant on the basket collection. The museum commissioned her to make a ceremonial basket in the Rumsien style and by Rumsien methods, which was unveiled to the public in 2012. The piece had over 20,000 stitches and 1,200 Olivella beads made by Yamane. The several thousand feathers on the basket were chicken feathers died red, because it is no longer legal to collect feathers from the acorn woodpecker, the traditional source. In addition, Yamane led multiple living history basket weaving demonstrations at the museum.

Select publications 
When the World Ended: How Hummingbird Got Fire; How People Were Made: Rumsien Ohlone Stories (1995) - recipient of a 1995 Aesop Accolades.

Weaving a California Tradition: A Native American Basketmaker (1996)

A Gathering of Voices: The Native peoples of the Central California Coast (editor; 2002)

The Dirt is Red Here: Art and Poetry from Native California (contributor; 2002)

References

Native American people from California
Native American linguists
Native American basket weavers
Native American women artists
Native American illustrators
Native American installation artists
Native American jewelers
Native American activists
Living people
1949 births
21st-century American women
Women jewellers
21st-century Native American women
21st-century Native Americans